"Señorita" is a song from the 2011 Indian film Zindagi Na Milegi Dobara. It was composed by Shankar–Ehsaan–Loy and performed by Farhan Akhtar, Hrithik Roshan, Abhay Deol and Spanish singer María del Mar Fernández. The lyrics were penned by Javed Akhtar. The Latino-flavoured Spanish flamenco song is about being yourself and having fun.

Development 
Director Zoya Akhtar insisted on Hrithik Roshan, Farhan Akhtar and Abhay Deol singing, as it was the only lip-sync song in the film. The actors agreed to it. The trio sing with traditional Spanish flamenco artist María del Mar Fernández, who made her debut with the song. She was auditioned by Shankar–Ehsaan–Loy to croon the Spanish portions.

This is the first time Abhay Deol has sung for a film, though both Farhan Akhtar and Hrithik Roshan made their singing debuts for Rock On!! and Kites respectively. They recorded a good part of the song by tricking the actors into believing that it is a rehearsal and used it since it sounded good.

Music video 
The video, choreographed by the duo of Bosco-Caesar, and shot in front of 'Bar El Parque' in Alájar, features Hrithik Roshan, Farhan Akhtar and Abhay Deol, the three leads with mayor Carmen Osorno and Concha Montero ‘La Taranta'. The mayor and the locals, who had no idea about Bollywood movies and their nature, came all dressed in the third day of the shooting and joined in with the crew. Zoya refused to use extras in the video and got some locals to dance with her lead actors. The song is picturised while on a road trip — the leads have a fun evening, break into a song, tap dance.

Reception 
Rediff in its music review, stated, "Señorita treads on cultural stereotypes with its flamenco-inspired beats, ethnic elements and lyricism represented by María Del Mar Fernández yet keeps it interesting by adding its own twist to the take." Meanwhile, Bollywood Hungama described the track as "A fun number with some impressive singing with Hrithik, Farhan and Abhay".  Bollyspice reviewer Vanessa Barnes, who loved the song, said, "This is a thoroughly Spanish track, from the guitars, the handclapping, the exuberance and the passion. It made me long to go back to Barcelona, because I can TASTE it."

A report, which was later published on Glamsham, remarked "Señorita has set the heart of nation to dance to the care free tunes of Salsa on which the music of the film is based."

Choreographer duo Bosco-Caesar won the 2011  National Film Award for Best Choreography for the song, as well as the Filmfare Award for Best Choreography.

Charts 
The song made its debut at #40 in BBC Asian Charts and steadily climbed to #34 by four weeks. Post film release, the song leapt its way to the #3 position.

The song topped the Radio Mirchi Top 10 chart replacing "Ik Junoon (Paint It Red)" of the same album, from the eighth week of its release.

The song made it to the 'Top 10 Hindi Songs of the year 2011' list by Indiatimes.

Accolades

See also 
Zindagi Na Milegi Dobara (soundtrack)
Ik Junoon (Paint It Red)

References

External links 
 Señorita official video song on YouTube

Songs with music by Shankar–Ehsaan–Loy
2011 songs
Indian songs
Hindi film songs
Flamenco-rock
Flamenco compositions
Songs with lyrics by Javed Akhtar